Callichroma holochlorum is a species of beetle in the family Cerambycidae. It was described by Henry Walter Bates in 1872. It is known from Mexico, Colombia, and Venezuela. It contains the subspecies Callichroma holochlorum holochlorum and Callichroma holochlorum melancholicum.

References

Callichromatini
Beetles described in 1872
Beetles of South America